This article provides details of international football games played by the South Africa national soccer team from 2020 to present.

Results

2020

2021

2022

Forthcoming fixtures
The following matches are scheduled:

Notes

References

Soccer in South Africa
South Africa national soccer team results
2020s in South African sport